Stephen Heard Darden (November 19, 1816 – May 16, 1902) was a prominent Texas politician who served in the Texas Senate and then as an officer in the Confederate Army during the American Civil War.

Life
Mr. Darden is of English-Irish descent, and a native of Mississippi. His entrance into Texas was as a volunteer soldier from the State of Mississippi, under Captain David M. Fulton, in the year 1836. In 1841, he became permanently established as a citizen of Texas.

At the outbreak of the Civil War, Darden received a commission as a first lieutenant in Company A of the 4th Texas Infantry in what became widely known as the Texas Brigade. He was promoted to the rank of captain before resigning to the join the Second Confederate Congress.

Darden was elected to the Texas House of Representatives in the 62nd district from November 7, 1853 to November 2, 1857 and was elected to the Texas Senate in the 25th district from November 4, 1861 to January 14, 1862.

He was elected to represent the First Congressional District of Texas in the Second Confederate Congress from 1864 to 1865.

Darden was elected as a Democrat to be Texas Comptroller of Public Accounts from 1874 to 1879.

Notes

External links

1816 births
1902 deaths
Confederate States Army officers
Members of the Confederate House of Representatives from Texas
19th-century American politicians
Texas state senators
Texas Brigade
Texas lawyers
Members of the Texas House of Representatives